"Singin' in the Rain" is a song with lyrics by Arthur Freed and music by Nacio Herb Brown. Introduced by Doris Eaton Travis in The Hollywood Music Box Revue, then months later by Cliff Edwards and the Brox Sisters in The Hollywood Revue of 1929, the song was subsequently recorded by many contemporary artists.

The musical film of the same name, Singin' in the Rain (1952), was "suggested by" the song. The performance by Gene Kelly dancing through puddles in a rainstorm garnered the song the third spot on the American Film Institute ranking of 100 Years...100 Songs.

Song form 
The song has an unusual form: the 32-bar chorus, rather than being preceded by a verse and containing an internal bridge as was becoming standard at the time, opens the song and then is followed by a 24-bar verse that has the feeling of a bridge before the chorus repeats.

Covers
B.A. Rolfe and his Lucky Strike Orchestra recorded the song possibly as early as 1928 but perhaps 1929. The song was recorded by Annette Hanshaw (reissued on the 1999 CD Annette Hanshaw, Volume 6, 1929).  It is performed on film by a nightclub band as dance music and sung in a Chinese dialect in The Ship from Shanghai (1930), by Jimmy Durante in Speak Easily (1932), by Judy Garland in Little Nellie Kelly (1940), and as background music at the beginning of MGM's The Divorcee (1930) starring Norma Shearer.
Singer Nick Lucas recorded Singing in the Rain in 1929 (one week after recording what would become the biggest hit of his career, Tiptoe Through the Tulips).
British duo Bob and Alf Pearson recorded the song in 1929 at their first session.
"Singin' in the Rain" was performed in the 1930 film short Dogville Melody, presumably by Zion Myers and Jules White.
Valaida Snow recorded it in 1935 accompanied by Billy Mason And His Orchestra - London, Apr 26, 1935 (Parlophone (E)F-165 (CE-6953-1))
The song is sung by Dean Martin in a November 1950 episode of the variety show The Colgate Comedy Hour. He performs it while being drenched in water by comedy partner and co-host Jerry Lewis.
The song is best known today as the centerpiece of the musical film Singin' in the Rain (1952), in which Gene Kelly memorably danced to the song while splashing through puddles during a rainstorm. The song is also performed during the opening credits of the film, and briefly near the end of the film by Debbie Reynolds.
The song was recorded in Buenos Aires for Odeon Records twice under the title "Cantando Bajo La Lluvia," by Francisco Canaro's orchestra and with the Spanish lyrics sung by Charlo, on December 23, 1929 (Catalog Number 16243 B, matrix number 5137) and again on March 24, 1930 (Catalog Number 4631 B/LDB 78 B, matrix number 5283). It was also recorded under the same title in 1936 by the Orquesta Tipica Victor, the RCA Victor in-house orchestra in Buenos Aires.
The song was also recorded by John Serry Sr. and his sextet ensemble in 1954 for RCA Victor records under the musical direction of Ben Selvin on an LP vinyl disc(See RCA Thesaurus).
In 1960, Adam Faith recorded his own version of this song on his début album Adam.
Bing Crosby and Rosemary Clooney recorded the song in 1961 for use on their radio show and it was subsequently included in the CD Bing & Rosie – The Crosby-Clooney Radio Sessions (2010). Crosby also included the song in a medley on his album On the Happy Side (1962).
In 1971, Scottish folk rock-singer John Martyn did an acoustic folk jazz-version on his album Bless the Weather, where he accompanied himself on acoustic guitar and sang several overdubbed backing vocals.
The Pasadena Roof Orchestra has covered the song on many occasions, including releasing it on The Best of the Pasadena Roof Orchestra album in 1973.
Sammy Davis Jr. gave the song a final US chart ride with a version widely played on easy listening stations (number 16 easy listening, 1974).
Leif Garrett released a version of the song on his 1979 album, Same Goes for You.
The song was covered by Polish musician Zbigniew Wodecki in 1979.
Glenn Butcher covered this song on the Australian video ABC for Kids Video Hits.
The song was incorporated by Michael Kamen into his score for the 1988 film Die Hard, where it is most closely associated with the character of Theo (Clarence Gilyard).
Brazilian musician Maurício Pereira wrote a Portuguese-language version of the song, "Cantando num Toró", present in his 1995 debut album Na Tradição.
British jazz/pop singer Jamie Cullum covered the song on his 2003 album Twentysomething.
The song was covered in 2004 by Carmen Bradford in her Jazz album "Home With You"
In the film called Robots, when Fender says goodbye to Loretta with a blowing kiss, he happily sings a parody called "Singing in the Oil" which is to the tune of this song and dances around until he gets caught by a Sweeper.
A version performed by the UK comedy partnership Morecambe and Wise was ranked at the top of a 2007 poll of their Greatest Moments.
A version was also performed by Jheena Lodwick in 2006, on her album titled "Singing in the rain".
Elton John live in Seoul, South Korea in 2004.
In 2009 the song was performed by Seth MacFarlane at The Proms.
An instrumental version of this song is played in Planet 51 where the space probe Rover dances happily Gene Kelly style when he sees raining rocks.
In 2009 and 2010 the song was performed by South Korean K-pop group Girls' Generation on their Into the New World Tour.
In 2010, the song was sung in the intermissions of concert tour of the Irish pop band Westlife.
In 2010, the song was sung on the FOX TV series Glee in a mash-up with Rihanna's "Umbrella" featuring Gwyneth Paltrow.
There is a jazz instrumental by Sonny Stitt on his 1958 album Sonny Stitt Plays Jimmy Giuffre Arrangements.
There is a jazz vocal rendition by Joe Williams on his 1984 album Then and Now.
Diana Krall included it on her 2020 album This Dream of You.
 Song is important plot device in Babylon (2022 film). It's featured in both 1929 Hollywood Revue and 1952 Singin' in the Rain version.

Mint Royale version

"Singin' in the Rain" was remixed in 2005 by Mint Royale. It was released as a single in August 2005 after being featured in an advert for the VW Golf GTI, peaking at No. 20 on the UK Singles Chart.

Three years later in 2008, due to the exposure of the song via the performance of then-unknown dancer George Sampson on the reality TV series Britain's Got Talent, the track went to No. 1 on the iTunes Top 100 in the UK in 2008. It re-entered the UK Singles Chart at No. 28 on June 1, 2008, and climbed to No. 1 the next week, selling 45,987 copies, knocking Rihanna's "Take a Bow" down to the Number 2 spot.

Charts

Sheila B. Devotion version
A 1978 disco version of Singin' in the Rain by the French pop singer Sheila B. Devotion made No. 3 in the Eurochart Hot 100 Singles and the Netherlands Top 100, No. 4 on the Nationale Hitparade, No. 11 on the German and UK Singles Chart, No. 2 on the Swedish Singles Chart, and No. 30 on the Hot Dance Club Songs.

Taco version
In 1982, Dutch pop singer Taco released a version of it as his second single from After Eight, which peaked at No. 49 in Germany, No. 46 in Canada and No. 98 in the UK.

In popular culture

1959 –  "Singin' in the Rain" is whistled by Cary Grant as he takes a shower after the crop duster plane attack in Alfred Hitchcock’s  North by Northwest.
1971 –  "Singin' in the Rain" is sung mockingly by Alex DeLarge, played by Malcolm McDowell, in the rape scene in Stanley Kubrick's film A Clockwork Orange. The Gene Kelly version plays during the end credits.
1982 – "Singin' in the Rain" is sung by Inspector Jacques Clouseau played by Peter Sellers as part of the extended version of the grocery scene from The Pink Panther Strikes Again in Blake Edwards's film Trail of the Pink Panther.
1990 – The song is referenced in the Terry Pratchett novel Moving Pictures. As people are infected with the dangerous idea of the clicks (movies), Mr. Dibbler, purveyor of sausages-inna-bun, dances down a wet and rainy road and swings off light poles, much to the bemusement of the city Watch.
1995 – The song was featured on the TV series Friends in season 2, episode 4, "The One with Phoebe's Husband", when Ross dances down the street the morning after having sex with Julie.
2001 – The song is often sung by Vadivelu's character "Steve Waugh" in the film Manadhai Thirudivittai to irritate Vivek's character. This inspired numerous memes and parodies in other Kollywood films after its release. The actor re-enacted the song scene briefly in the 2017 film Mersal.
2007 – The song is sung in The Diving Bell and the Butterfly by the character of Jean-Dominique Bauby as a boy waiting with his father at the Berck railway station.
2017 – The 2017 Eurovision entry of Italy, Occidentali's Karma, features the phrase "Comunque vada panta rei, and Singing in the Rain".
2019 – The song is also used in the season 2 episode, "A Happy Refrain" of Seth MacFarlane's TV series The Orville.
2022 – The song appears twice in the early Hollywood golden era comedy-drama Babylon, first as a performance being filmed to showcase MGM's "more stars than there are in heaven" sung by the studio's contract players, and most prominently at the end of the film in a scene set in 1952 in a Hollywood movie theater playing the Gene Kelly feature.

Other appearances in film and on TV

 The Hollywood Revue of 1929 (1929)
 The Ship from Shanghai (1930)
 The Girl Said No (1930) 
 The Woman Racket (1930)
 The Dogway Melody (1930)
 The Divorcee (1930)
 Rain or Shine (1930)
 Men Call It Love (1932)
 Speak Easily (1932)
 The Old Dark House (1932) (as "Singing in the Bath", not to be confused with 1929's "Singing in the Bathtub".)
 Skyscraper Souls (1932)
 Babes in Arms (1939)
 Idiot's Delight (1939)
 Little Nellie Kelly (1940)
 Dulcy (1940)
 Unexpected Uncle (1941)
 Maisie Gets Her Man (1942)
 Happy Go Lucky (1943)
 The Big Noise (1944)
 The Babe Ruth Story (1948)

 North by Northwest (1959)
 The Munsters (1965)

 El Chapulin Colorado (1978)
 Fame (1980)
 Pennies from Heaven (1981)
 The Slugger's Wife (1985)
 Fever Pitch (1985)
 Legal Eagles (1986)
 Die Hard (1988)
 What About Bob? (1991)
 Jeeves and Wooster (1991)
 Léon: The Professional (1994)
 Godzilla (1998)
 Shanghai Knights (2003)
 Robots (2005) (as "Singin' in the Oil")
 Kara no Kyōkai (Murder Speculation Part 1, "The Hollow Shrine") (2008)
 Glee (TV, episode "The Substitute" (2010))
 Phineas and Ferb (TV, 2011) {partly sung by Dr. Doofenshmirtz with altered lyrics in the episode "The Great Indoors"}
 Babylon (2022)

References

External links 
Video of Kurt Browning skating to Kelly's recording of the song

Songs about weather
1929 songs
Songs with lyrics by Arthur Freed
Songs with music by Nacio Herb Brown
Lena Horne songs
Leif Garrett songs
Taco (musician) songs
Songs from musicals
2005 singles
Mint Royale songs
UK Singles Chart number-one singles
Rain in culture
Gene Kelly songs
Sheila (singer) songs
1920s neologisms
Quotations from music
Quotations from film